27th meridian may refer to:

27th meridian east, a line of longitude east of the Greenwich Meridian
27th meridian west, a line of longitude west of the Greenwich Meridian